Margarita Yakovleva (born August 27, 1981) is a Ukrainian journalist, poet and writer. The Member of the International Federation of Journalists since 2007. The author of articles in economics and finance field. Since September 2013 she is working with Forbes Ukraine.

Biography
Margarita Ormotsadze was born in Kyiv. in the family of engineers. She is the native Kyivan in the six generation. The secondary education received in school № 24 (1998). Ormotsadze graduated as engineer of computer sciences from the Kyiv Polytechnic Institute. Since 2006 she is working as business journalist. She was an editor and journalist in the newspapers and journals as The Ukrainian Week, Fokus, DELO.

Creative activity
Margarita writes poetry since 5 years old. She has been publishing as a poet since 1996. Now published four books, including "Far. Nigh" (Kyiv, 2006), "Grand travel" (Donetsk, 2011). 
Her novels are dedicated to the travels and to the Middle East and Western European mystical traditions.,

She is a photo-artist. Her expositions and photo-projects were shown in the annual multidisciplinary international festival of contemporary art and cinema Gogolfest

Awards
 Certificate of honor of the Ministry of Justice of Ukraine, 2004
 International Contest among business mass media journalists of Russia and Ukraine – PRESSzvanie Business Circles Prize 2008. Best journalist in Insurance (first place), Best journalist in Business and society (third place), 2009
 Honorary diploma of the State Tax Service of Ukraine, 2010
 PRESSzvanie Business Circles Prize-2011, Best journalist in Telecommunications and IT (third place), 2012

References

1981 births
Writers from Kyiv
Ukrainian women journalists
Ukrainian women writers
Ukrainian women poets
Kyiv Polytechnic Institute alumni
Living people
20th-century Ukrainian poets
20th-century women writers